Daniel Fernandez (born December 22, 1981), better known by his stage name Def3, is a Canadian rapper from Regina, Saskatchewan, based in Vancouver, British Columbia. He is the founder of Ship Records, and a member of the groups Side Road, Dead Can't Bounce, and Metropolis Now. In 2015, Def3 won the Western Canadian Music Award for "Rap/Hip-Hop Recording of the Year" for his 2014 album Wildlif3.

Discography

Albums
Solo
 Hug Life (Ship, 2005) (produced by Merky Waters)
 Drumbo (Side Road, 2009) (produced by Factor)
 Wildlif3 (Urbnet, 2014) (produced by Factor)
 Small World (Ship, 2017) (produced by Late Night Radio)
 Weddings and Funerals (Urbnet, 2021) (produced by Late Night Radio)

Collaborations
 I Aint Afraid of No Ghost (Frek Sho, 2003) (with Ira Lee, as Dead Can't Bounce)
 Metropolis Now (Side Road, 2006) (with Factor, Forgetful Jones & Kay the Aquanaut, as Metropolis Now)
 Dog River (Ship, 2007) (with Moka Only)

EPs
 The Hardy Boys of Rap (Goodbye, 2003) (with Ira Lee, as Dead Can't Bounce)
 Amnesia (2011) (produced by Mosaic)
 Wildlif3: Late Night Radio Remixes (Urbnet, 2016) (produced by Late Night Radio)
 Small World Remixes (Ship, 2020)

Guest appearances

References

External links 
Official website
Def3 on Rate Your Music
Def3 on Discogs

1981 births
Living people
21st-century Canadian rappers
Musicians from Regina, Saskatchewan
Canadian male rappers